The Greensboro Review, founded in 1966, is one of the nation's oldest literary magazines, based at the University of North Carolina at Greensboro in Greensboro, North Carolina.  It publishes fiction and poetry  on a semi-annual basis.  Work from the journal is featured in such anthologies as New Stories from the South, the O. Henry Prize Stories, and the Best American Short Stories. Founded by poet Robert Watson, the journal was edited for many years by Jim Clark during his tenure as director of the MFA program; it is currently edited by MFA director Terry L. Kennedy. The original design of the magazine was updated in 1989 by then-MFA in Poetry candidate S. P. Donohue, who served as the poetry editor and production manager from 1989–90.

The Review awards the Robert Watson Literary Prizes.

Notable contributors 

Natasha Trethewey
Claudia Emerson
George Singleton
Bret Anthony Johnston

Viet Dinh
Jacob M. Appel
Kelly Cherry
Kelly Link

See also 
List of literary magazines

References

External links
 Greensboro Review website
 100th issue

1969 establishments in North Carolina
Biannual magazines published in the United States
Literary magazines published in the United States
Magazines established in 1969
Magazines published in North Carolina
Mass media in Greensboro, North Carolina
University of North Carolina at Greensboro